Benjamin Baltes (born 30 March 1984) is a German former professional footballer who played as a midfielder.

Career
Baltes was born in Saarbrücken.

He began playing for KFC Uerdingen 05 in 2002, having switched from the youth team to the first team. Just after he achieved a Player of the Year award for Uerdingen, he found himself on the move, unhappy that he would be playing third division football. He decided to move to SC Freiburg, where he was contracted until 2008.

In August 2006, after trialling with TuS Koblenz, he switched to VfB Lübeck, where he played for eighteen months, before moving to Rot-Weiss Essen. He then joined Aue in 2008 and was released on 30 June 2009.

After trialling with the club, Baltes signed with Eredivisie team SBV Excelsior.

In July 2011, he joined the German Regionalliga West side Wuppertaler SV.

In 2020 he returned to former club KFC Uerdingen 05.

Baltes played for the Germany U20 national team.

References

External links
 
 
 
 

Living people
1984 births
German footballers
Association football midfielders
KFC Uerdingen 05 players
SC Freiburg players
VfB Lübeck players
Rot-Weiss Essen players
FC Erzgebirge Aue players
Borussia Mönchengladbach II players
Excelsior Rotterdam players
Wuppertaler SV players
Eredivisie players
2. Bundesliga players
3. Liga players
German expatriate footballers
German expatriate sportspeople in the Netherlands
Expatriate footballers in the Netherlands
Sportspeople from Saarbrücken